Rüdiger Abramczik (born 18 February 1956) is a former German football player and coach, best known for his ability to cross the ball ("Flankengott").

Club career 
Abramczik was born in Gelsenkirchen-Erle. He, whose younger brother Volker later became also a professional footballer for FC Schalke 04, joined the ranks of the city's biggest club, Schalke 04, from native SV Erle 08 at the age of ten after former German international Bernhard Klodt spotted him. Schalke's former Bundesliga player Friedel Rausch was partly coaching him in the youth of Schalke then, getting impressed by his unique mobility and pace. It was Rausch who warmly recommended young Abi to Schalke's manager Ivica Horvath, feeling the schoolboy international (23 caps) could already do a job on the highest level.

For the kick-off of the 1973–74 Bundesliga season, FC Schalke 04 travelled to VfB Stuttgart to see Horvath handing him a starting role. Schalke lost, with Stuttgart's Hermann Ohlicher's hat-trick the only goals in the game, but Abramczik's appearance on that 11 August made him the youngest ever player used on Bundesliga level at that time. Making fourteen appearances in his Bundesliga debut season, he went on to become a key player for his club in less than three years, netting ten goals for Schalke in 1976–77, when they finished runner-up behind Borussia Mönchengladbach. The yield of ten goals scored by the then 20-year-old Abramczik remained the best effort of a young Bundesliga player until Lukas Podolski hit ten for 1. FC Köln as an eighteen-year-old in 2003–04.

Joining FC Schalke 04's bitter arch-rival Borussia Dortmund at the end of the 1979–80 season, Abramczik's days in Dortmund lasted until he joined 1. FC Nürnberg in 1983. That worked out to be a disastrous career move for the Gelsenkirchen-born, his new club was relegated from Bundesliga with him getting suspended by the club for committing misconduct. He then showed up for Galatasaray Istanbul under Jupp Derwall and had a spell with Rot-Weiß Oberhausen in the 2. Bundesliga before heading back to hometown club FC Schalke 04 in October 1987. Coming to action in four further Bundesliga matches in the space of five weeks for them, a campaign in which Schalke was chanceless to avoid the drop to 2. Bundesliga, Abramczik decided to retire from the professional game to go on playing on amateur level for Wormatia Worms and FC Gütersloh.

International career 
Köln's Müngersdorfer Stadion witnessed Rüdiger Abramczik's Germany debut when the side of Helmut Schön beat Northern Ireland (5–0) on 27 April 1977. Abramczik, who was forming a formidable striker duo with Klaus Fischer for Schalke at that time, was called up further by Schön and with the 1978 FIFA World Cup at stage, Abramczik enjoyed his taking part in it for the defending champion. Tipped to be a delight for Germany, failing to produce greater consistency in his game appeared to be the bar to his further proceedings in Die Nationalmannschaft. His life as a German international lasted for only nineteen caps in between 1977 and 1979, with a 3–1 win against Malta at Gżira his last international cap, an abrupt end furthered by a voiced conflict with then DFB president Hermann Neuberger.

Coaching career 
Abramczik's career in coaching was caused by his decision to work as assistant-manager of Peter Neururer at 1. FC Saarbrücken when he run a dyeworks shop in Gelsenkirchen. A year later, Saarbrücken appointed him Neururer's successor in 1992. He managed Antalyaspor from 1999 to 2000.

Career statistics
Scores and results list West Germany's goal tally first, score column indicates score after each Abramczik goal.

References

External links 
 
 
 
 

1956 births
Living people
German footballers
Germany international footballers
Germany B international footballers
West German footballers
West German expatriate footballers
West German expatriate sportspeople in Turkey
German football managers
FC Schalke 04 players
Borussia Dortmund players
1. FC Nürnberg players
Galatasaray S.K. footballers
Süper Lig players
Rot-Weiß Oberhausen players
1978 FIFA World Cup players
Bundesliga players
2. Bundesliga players
Sportspeople from Gelsenkirchen
PFC Levski Sofia managers
FC Gütersloh 2000 players
Expatriate footballers in Turkey
German expatriate football managers
Expatriate football managers in Austria
Expatriate football managers in Bulgaria
Expatriate football managers in Latvia
Expatriate football managers in Turkey
1. FC Saarbrücken managers
Antalyaspor managers
FC Kärnten managers
FK Liepājas Metalurgs managers
Wormatia Worms players
Biography articles needing translation from German Wikipedia
Sports articles needing translation from German Wikipedia
Association football forwards
Footballers from North Rhine-Westphalia
German expatriate sportspeople in Turkey
German expatriate sportspeople in Austria
German expatriate sportspeople in Latvia
German expatriate sportspeople in Bulgaria